Robert Nigel Paul Macaire CMG (born 19 February 1966) is a British diplomat who served as UK's Ambassador to Iran from 2018 to 2021. 

Macaire has held a number of senior posts in the  Foreign and Commonwealth Office (FCO), and prior to his Iran posting he was the Director of Political Risk in BG Group plc.

Career 
Rob Macaire joined the Ministry of Defence in 1987, and worked on a number of issues including procurement policy and supporting Special Forces, before transferring to the Foreign and Commonwealth Office (FCO) in 1990. His first diplomatic posting was in Bucharest, Romania from 1991 to 1995. He returned to the UK to work on the Middle East, following which he was posted to Washington, as First Secretary Middle East and Counter Terrorism, from 1998 to 2002. This included dealing with the aftermath of the 9/11 terrorist attacks.

In 2002 Macaire returned to London to head the Counter Terrorism Policy Department in the Foreign Office in the immediate post 9/11 period. He served as Political Counsellor in New Delhi, India from 2004 to 2006, during which time he led a team responding to the 2004 Indian Ocean earthquake and tsunami in Phuket, Thailand. He returned to London as Director of Consular Services, responsible for all support to UK nationals abroad, including crisis response. In 2008 he was appointed British High Commissioner to Nairobi, Kenya, where he served until 2011. In Nairobi, he was involved among other things with Kenyans' efforts to fight corruption in their country, support for Kenya's new constitution in 2010, and was responsible for UK dealings with Somalia, including kidnap and hijack cases.

Macaire has also worked as Director of Political Risk in BG Group plc.

On 14 March 2018 the British Foreign and Commonwealth Office announced Rob Macaire as the new envoy to Tehran, replacing Nicholas Hopton.

Arrest in Iran

Macaire was arrested on 11 January 2020 during protests in Tehran about the shooting down of Flight 752 to Ukraine, but released shortly afterwards. In reaction, the FCO described his arrest as "a flagrant violation of international law", and Foreign Secretary Dominic Raab suggested that Iran was engaged in a "march to pariah status". Macaire maintained he did not attend a protest, but a vigil for victims of the plane crash and noted that "arresting diplomats is of course illegal".

Iranian judges called on the government to expel Macaire by declaring him persona non grata as placards and cutouts of him were burnt, and protesters chanting 'Death to the UK' outside the British Embassy in the capital Tehran. This is not thought to be a formal declaration and so does not have any legal standing with regard to his diplomatic status.

Personal life 

Macaire was educated at Cranleigh School and won an Exhibition to St Edmund Hall, Oxford (MA Modern History). In 1996, he married Alice (née Mackenzie). While they were stationed in Kenya, Alice founded and chaired the initiative which resulted in the transformation of the Karura Forest. They have two daughters.

References

External links 

 Debrett's People of Today

1966 births
Living people
People educated at Cranleigh School
Alumni of St Edmund Hall, Oxford
Ambassadors of the United Kingdom to Iran
Companions of the Order of St Michael and St George
Civil servants in the Foreign Office